Craig-y-pistyll is a Site of Special Scientific Interest in Ceredigion,  west Wales. It is a reservoir with a dam at one end which supplies water to the Aberystwyth area.

See also
List of Sites of Special Scientific Interest in Ceredigion

Sites of Special Scientific Interest in Ceredigion